Standard Bank Limited is a private commercial bank in Bangladesh. Khondokar Rashed Maqsood is the managing director and CEO of the bank as January 2020.
Touhidul Alam Khan is the additional managing director of the bank as of 24 November 2020. Kazi Akram Uddin Ahmed is the founder chairman of the bank and Kamal Mostafa Chowdhury is the founder vice-chairman and director of the bank.

History
The bank was founded  on 3 June 1999, with an approved capital of 750 million taka. Kazi Akram Uddin Ahmed was the founding chairman of the bank.

In July 2004, Standard Bank provided 100 million BDT credit to International Leasing and Financial Services Limited.

The Bank decided provide a 12 per cent dividend in 2007 at the 9th annual general meeting at the BDR Darbar Hall presided by chairman Kazi Akramuddin Ahmed.

Mamun-Ur-Rashid was appointed managing director of the bank in October 2016. Standard Bank Limited expanded outside Bangladesh by opening branches in Saudi Arabia.

Standard Bank Limited decided to switch to sharia complaint banking from traditional banking; it remained close for four days in December 2020 to make the transition.

The Anti-Corruption Commission filed a case against former managing director of Standard Bank Limited, Mamun Ur Rashid, and seven other officials of Sachetan Sahajjo Songstha and Standard Bank Limited for misappropriating 40 million BDT from the Bank in February 2021. Senior Special Judge Md Asaduzzaman of the Dhaka Metropolitan Court sent former managing director of Standard Bank Limited, Mamun Ur Rashid, to jail in a case over the embezzlement of 40 million BDT from the bank in October 2022.

In January 2023, Standard Bank Limited donated 40 million taka to the relief fund of Prime Minister Sheikh Hasina. Kazi Khurram Ahmed, son of the Kazi Akram Uddin Ahmed, chairman of Standard Bank Limited, was elected vice-chairman of the bank.

Financial services
 SME Banking
 Retails Banking
 Card Service (Credit & Debit)
 Foreign Exchange & Related Services
 Probashi Banking
 Agent Banking
 Islami Banking

References

Banks of Bangladesh
Banks established in 1988
Islamic banks of Bangladesh